Nicole Jane Boegman-Stewart, formerly married Staines (born 5 March 1967 in Sydney) is a retired Australian long jumper.

Her personal best jump was 6.87 metres, achieved in August 1988 in Gateshead. Wind aided best 7.12 metres (+4.3) achieved in Sestriere, 1995. The Australian, and Oceanian, record currently belongs to Bronwyn Thompson with 7.00 metres. Has represented Australia at 3 Olympic Games, 5 World Outdoor Championships, 3 World Indoor Championships and 3 Commonwealth Games. Nine times Australian Champion. Current Australian and Oceania Indoor Record holder 6.81 metres, achieved in Barcelona 1995. Held Australian Triple Jump record (13.28 m) from 1993 to 1996.

Since retiring from competition Boegman-Stewart has worked in sports administration and is currently the Track & Field Program Coordinator for the New South Wales Institute of Sport.

International competitions

References

 
 Nicole Boegman at Australian Athletics Historical Results

External links
 
 
 
 
 

1967 births
Living people
Australian female long jumpers
Australian female triple jumpers
Athletes (track and field) at the 1986 Commonwealth Games
Athletes (track and field) at the 1994 Commonwealth Games
Athletes (track and field) at the 1998 Commonwealth Games
Athletes (track and field) at the 1988 Summer Olympics
Athletes (track and field) at the 1992 Summer Olympics
Athletes (track and field) at the 1996 Summer Olympics
Olympic athletes of Australia
Sportswomen from New South Wales
Australian Institute of Sport track and field athletes
Athletes from Sydney
Commonwealth Games medallists in athletics
Commonwealth Games gold medallists for Australia
Commonwealth Games bronze medallists for Australia
Competitors at the 2001 Goodwill Games
20th-century Australian women
21st-century Australian women
Medallists at the 1994 Commonwealth Games
Medallists at the 1998 Commonwealth Games